Vingelen is a village in Tolga Municipality in Innlandet county, Norway.

Vingelen Church has been located in the village for centuries. This village was the main village in the Tolga area until the 1600s when the village of Tolga grew up around a smelter that was built along the river Glåma. The people of Vingelen have historically worked in the agriculture and forestry industries.

Media gallery

References

Tolga, Norway
Villages in Innlandet